Lafayette or La Fayette may refer to:

People
 Lafayette (name), a list of people with the surname Lafayette or La Fayette or the given name Lafayette
 House of La Fayette, a French noble family
 Gilbert du Motier, Marquis de Lafayette (1757–1834), French general and American Revolutionary War general also prominent in the French Revolution
 James Lafayette, pseudonym of James Stack Lauder (1853–1923), Irish portrait photographer

Places

United States
 LaFayette, Alabama, a city
 Lafayette, California, a city
 Lafayette, Colorado, a home rule municipality
 LaFayette, Georgia, a city
 La Fayette, Illinois, a village
 Lafayette, Indiana metropolitan area
 Lafayette, Indiana, a city
 LaFayette, Kentucky, a town
 Lafayette, Louisiana metropolitan area
 Lafayette, Louisiana, a city
 Lafayette Parish, Louisiana
 Lafayette, Minnesota, a city
 LaFayette, New York, a town
 Lafayette, Ohio, a village
 Lafayette, Madison County, Ohio, a census-designated place
 Lafayette, Oregon, a city
 Lafayette, Tennessee, a city
 Lafayette, Virginia, a census-designated place
 Lafayette, Wisconsin (disambiguation)
 Faubourg Lafayette, Louisiana, a division in the city of New Orleans 
 Mount Lafayette, New Hampshire
 Lafayette County (disambiguation)
 Lafayette Hill, Pennsylvania
 Lafayette Park (disambiguation)
 Lafayette Reservoir, Contra Costa County, California 
 Lafayette River, entirely in the city of Norfolk, Virginia
 Lafayette Square (disambiguation)
 Lafayette Township (disambiguation)
 Lafayette Village, a historic district in North Kingstown, Rhode Island; on the National Register of Historic Places

Other countries
 Lafayette (Tunis), a district of Tunis, Tunisia

Arts and entertainment
 La Fayette (film), also known as Lafayette, a 1961 French/Italian co-production starring Orson Welles and Pascale Audret
 "Lafayette (We Hear You Calling)", a 1918 World War I song composed by Mary Earl (Robert A. King)
 Lafayette, a Basset Hound in the animated film Aristocats 
 Lafayette Reynolds, one of the principal characters in True Blood, an American TV series
 Lafayette O'Leary, the protagonist in four Keith Laumer science fiction novels

Buildings
 Lafayette Building (disambiguation)
 Lafayette Hotel (disambiguation)
 Lafayette Theatre (disambiguation)

Businesses
 Galeries Lafayette, a French department store chain
 LaFayette Motors, United States automobile manufacturer from the 1910s to the 1940s
 Lafayette Radio Electronics, an electronics retail chain that closed in 1981
 Lafayette (restaurant), a former French restaurant in New York City

Military
 USS Lafayette, three US Navy ships
 Lafayette-class submarine, a class of US submarine
 French aircraft carrier La Fayette, a French aircraft carrier, formerly USS Langley (CVL-27)
 La Fayette-class frigate, a class of French frigates
 French frigate La Fayette, a French stealth frigate, lead ship of the La Fayette class
 Fort Lafayette, a coastal fortification in the Narrows of New York Harbor
 Brigade La Fayette, also named Task Force La Fayette, a joint unit of the French forces in Afghanistan
 Lafayette Escadrille, a World War I squadron of the French Air Service composed largely of American pilots
 Lafayette Flying Corps, a name given to American volunteer pilots who flew for the French in World War I

Schools
 University of Louisiana at Lafayette
 Lafayette College, a private coeducational college in Easton, Pennsylvania
 Lafayette High School (disambiguation)

Transportation
 Lafayette Avenue (IND Fulton Street Line), Brooklyn, a New York City Subway station
 Broadway–Lafayette Street/Bleecker Street (New York City Subway) Manhattan 
 Lafayette station (Indiana), an Amtrak station in Lafayette, Indiana
 Lafayette station (Louisiana), an Amtrak station in Lafayette, Louisiana
 Lafayette station (BART) is BART station in Lafayette, California
 Lafayette Square station, Buffalo, New York, Metro Rail station
 Lafayette Regional Airport Lafayette, Louisiana
 Lafayette Street a street in lower Manhattan, New York City
 Lafayette Boulevard a street in Detroit, Michigan
 Lafayette Bridge, spanning the Mississippi River in St Paul, Minnesota
 Rue La Fayette a street in Paris, France
 , a shipwreck in Lake Superior, United States
 , a French ocean liner that was called Lafayette from 1915 until 1928

Other uses
 Lafayette Cemetery, a defunct cemetery in Philadelphia
 Lafayette Cemetery No. 1, a cemetery in New Orleans
 Lafayette Stakes, an annual American Thoroughbred horse race in Lexington, Kentucky
 23244 Lafayette, a main-belt minor planet
 Lafayette meteorite, a nakhlite Martian meteorite

See also
 Lafayette transmitter, a former transmitter for transatlantic services near Bordeaux, France
 Fayette (disambiguation)
 Fayette County (disambiguation)
 Fayette Township (disambiguation)
 West Lafayette
 Sigmund Neuberger (1871–1911) illusionist under the stage name "The Great Lafayette"
 Fayetteville (disambiguation)